Isaac James Mass (born 1976) is a Franklin County, Massachusetts, United States, politician and attorney.

External links
 Mass's Legal Practice Website

Massachusetts city council members
Western New England University alumni
1976 births
Living people
Place of birth missing (living people)
Date of birth missing (living people)
People from Franklin County, Massachusetts